Colony is a city in Anderson County, Kansas, United States.  As of the 2020 census, the population of the city was 381.

History
Colony had its start in the year 1872 by the building of the railroad through that territory. It was named for a colony from Ohio and Indiana, which settled in the neighborhood.

The railroad tracks in Colony have since been converted to a rail trail. The trail is part of the Prairie Spirit Trail State Park.

Geography
Colony is located at  (38.070803, -95.366109).

Climate
The climate in this area is characterized by hot, humid summers and generally mild to cool winters.  According to the Köppen Climate Classification system, Colony has a humid subtropical climate, abbreviated "Cfa" on climate maps.

Demographics

2010 census
As of the census of 2010, there were 408 people, 177 households, and 112 families residing in the city. The racial makeup of the city was 94.4% White, 1.7% African American, 0.2% Native American, 0.2% Asian, and 3.4% from two or more races. Hispanic or Latino of any race were 0.2% of the population.

There were 177 households, of which 26.0% had children under the age of 18 living with them, 50.3% were married couples living together, 9.0% had a female householder with no husband present, 4.0% had a male householder with no wife present, and 36.7% were non-families. 34.5% of all households were made up of individuals, and 19.7% had someone living alone who was 65 years of age or older. The average household size was 2.31 and the average family size was 2.98.

The median age in the city was 44.5 years. 24% of residents were under the age of 18; 7.6% were between the ages of 18 and 24; 19.1% were from 25 to 44; 24% were from 45 to 64; and 25.2% were 65 years of age or older. The gender makeup of the city was 49.5% male and 50.5% female.

2000 census
As of the census of 2000, there were 397 people, 160 households, and 120 families residing in the city. The racial makeup of the city was 94.96% White, 0.25% African American, 0.76% Native American, 0.25% Asian, and 3.78% from two or more races. Hispanic or Latino of any race were 2.02% of the population.

There were 160 households, out of which 30.0% had children under the age of 18 living with them, 62.5% were married couples living together, 9.4% had a female householder with no husband present, and 24.4% were non-families. 24.4% of all households were made up of individuals, and 15.0% had someone living alone who was 65 years of age or older. The average household size was 2.48 and the average family size was 2.90.

In the city, the population was spread out, with 26.4% under the age of 18, 6.0% from 18 to 24, 21.9% from 25 to 44, 19.4% from 45 to 64, and 26.2% who were 65 years of age or older. The median age was 42 years. For every 100 females, there were 78.8 males. For every 100 females age 18 and over, there were 88.4 males.

The median income for a household in the city was $25,167, and the median income for a family was $27,708. Males had a median income of $27,917 versus $20,000 for females. The per capita income for the city was $11,398. About 13.8% of families and 16.6% of the population were below the poverty line, including 21.5% of those under age 18 and 21.6% of those age 65 or over.

Education
Colony is part of USD 479 Crest. The district high school is Crest High School.

Notable people
 Dean Brooks, psychiatrist and actor

References

Further reading

External links

 Colony - Directory of Public Officials
 USD 479, school district for Colony, Kincaid
 Colony History , Anderson County 
 Numerous Anderson County documents and photos
 Colony city map, KDOT

Cities in Kansas
Cities in Anderson County, Kansas
1872 establishments in Kansas
Populated places established in 1872